Mikhaylovka is a rural locality (a village) in Krasnovoskhodsky Selsoviet, Iglinsky District, Bashkortostan, Russia. The population was 211 as of 2010. There are 2 streets.

Geography 
Mikhaylovka is located 75 km northeast of Iglino (the district's administrative centre) by road. Ustyugovka is the nearest rural locality.

References 

Rural localities in Iglinsky District